"You and Me Song" is a song by Swedish band the Wannadies. Originally released as a single in November 1994, it became the group's biggest hit. In April 1996, it peaked at number 18 in the United Kingdom.

Song information
Appearing on the band's third album, Be a Girl, the song was also included on their next album, Bagsy Me, due to the success of the re-released single and the song's appearance on the soundtrack of Baz Luhrmann's film Romeo + Juliet. For the second UK single release, the song's title acquired an ampersand. The B-side, "Blister in the Sun", is a cover of a song by the Violent Femmes.

Track listings
Original Swedish release (1994)
 "You and Me Song"
 "Let Go Oh Oh"

First UK release (1995)
 7-inch (DIE001)
 "You and Me Song"
 "Blister in the Sun"

 CD (DIE001CD)
 "You and Me Song"
 "Blister in the Sun"
 "Lift Me Up (Don't Let Me Down)"

Second UK release (1996)
 7-inch (DIE005 – limited blue vinyl)
 "You & Me Song"
 "Blister in the Sun"
 "Everybody Loves Me"

 CD (DIE005CD)
 "You & Me Song"
 "Everybody Loves Me"
 "I Like You a Lalalala Lot"
 "You & Me Song" (lounge version)

Third UK release (1997)
 7-inch (DIE011 – limited to 3,000 copies)
 "You & Me Song"
 "Just Can't Get Enough"

10th anniversary release (2004)
 7-inch (DIE011 – limited to 3,000 copies)
 "You & Me Song (feat. Richard Hillman)"
 "I'm Not In Love"

Certifications

Release history

References

1994 singles
1994 songs
1995 singles
1996 singles
1997 singles
RCA Records singles
The Wannadies songs